Sinz may refer to:

Places 
 Sinz, district of Perl, Saarland, Germany

People 
  (born 1928), Austrian psychologist and researcher
 Elmar Sinz (born 1951), German Professor of business informatics
  (1913–1989), German historian and author
 Walter Sinz (1881–1966), American sculptor